Brihaspa nigropunctella is a moth in the family Crambidae. It was described by Pagenstecher in 1893. It is found in Mozambique.

References

Moths described in 1893
Schoenobiinae